Here Stands Fats Domino is a 1957 studio album by American rock and roll pianist Fats Domino, released on Imperial Records.

Reception
The editorial staff of AllMusic Guide scored this release three out of five stars, with reviewer Bruce Eder, noting the diversity of Domino's styles, from "surprisingly elegant ballad" to "pounding rocker" and "slow blues... [with] some supremely subtle sax work". The New Rolling Stone Album Guide scores this release alongside all of Domino's Imperial albums as 4.5 out of five stars.

Track listing
All songs written by Dave Bartholomew and Fats Domino, except where noted.

Side one:
"Detroit City Blues" – 2:25
"Hide Away Blues" – 2:22
"She’s My Baby" – 2:38
"New Baby" (Bartholomew) – 2:34
"Little Bee" (Bartholomew) – 2:24
"Every Night About This Time" – 2:03
Side two:
"I’m Walkin’" – 2:01
"I’m in the Mood for Love" (Dorothy Fields and Jimmy McHugh) – 2:40
"Cheatin’" (Domino) – 2:33
"You Can Pack Your Suitcase" – 2:18
"Hey! Fat Man" (Domino) – 2:32
"I’ll Be Gone" (Domino and Al Young) – 2:18

References

External links

Review by George Starostin

1957 albums
Fats Domino albums
Imperial Records albums